The William O. Douglas Prize (also known as the William O. Douglas Award) is given by the Commission on Freedom of Expression of the Speech Communication Association to honor those who contribute to writing about freedom of speech. The Award is named after William O. Douglas, who served as an Associate Justice of the Supreme Court of the United States from 1939 to 1975.

Recognition
The William O. Douglas Prize is given by the Commission on Freedom of Expression of the Speech Communication Association to authors. The prize recognizes distinguished work in the field of writing about the subject of freedom of speech.

Honorees

1992 Rodney A. Smolla, Free Speech in an Open Society

See also

Free speech fights
Freedom of information
Perilous Times: Free Speech in Wartime from the Sedition Act of 1798 to the War on Terrorism
The Freedom Paradox: Towards a Post-Secular Ethics
William J. Brennan Award

Further reading

References

Free expression awards
Literary awards honouring human rights
American literary awards
Legal awards